Chesapeake  is the third studio album by American singer-songwriter Rachael Yamagata. It was released on October 11, 2011 via Frankenfish Records and Megaforce Records in North America.

Development
Recorded in Maryland, Chesapeake is Yamagata's first studio album since 2008’s Elephants...Teeth Sinking into Heart. She utilized the fan-funded music platform PledgeMusic to fund the album. She parted ways from her record label, and released it through her own label called Frankenfish Records. She told Steve Baltin of Rolling Stone, "It was really gratifying in that sense because I don’t have the pressures of a major label anymore. In a funny way, I think this might be a more commercial record for me in terms of reaching a broader audience because there was no attempt or requirement to be anything but what we felt like doing in the room." She reunited with John Alagía, the producer of her debut album, Happenstance, to help produce the album.

Critical reception
James Christopher Monger of AllMusic said, "by far Yamagata's most laid-back release to date, offering up ten tracks that run the gamut from lush and languid ("Saturday Morning", "Even If I Don’t") to sultry and spooky ("Starlight") and back again with the easy confidence of an artist on her home turf."

Covers
"You Won't Let Me" was covered by Australian recording artist Karise Eden, who won the first series of The Voice (Australia).

Track listing

Personnel 
John Alagía – Electric guitar, background vocals, Mixer
Michael Chavez – Acoustic guitar, electric guitar, mandolin
Tom Freund – Bass  
Pete Hanlon – Electric guitar
Sean Hurley – Bass
Victor Indrizzo – Drums, percussion
Oli Krauss – Cello, strings
Zac Rae – Farfisa Organ, electric guitar, keyboards, organ, synthesizer, tack piano, vibraphone
Eric Robinson – Engineer, Mixer
Kevin Salem – Dobro, electric guitar, slide guitar
Mike Viola – Fender Rhodes, acoustic guitar, keyboards, piano, background vocals 
Rachael Yamagata – Acoustic guitar, piano, tambourine, trumpet, vocals

References

External links 
 

2011 albums
Rachael Yamagata albums